Ilex syzygiophylla is a species of plant in the family Aquifoliaceae. It is endemic to China.

References

Endemic flora of China
syzygiophylla
Endangered plants
Taxonomy articles created by Polbot